Brevoxathres albobrunneus is a species of longhorn beetles of the subfamily Lamiinae. It was described by Gilmour in 1962, and is known from Peru and Bolivia.

References

Beetles described in 1962
Acanthocinini